The 1985–86 Ronchetti Cup was the 15th edition of the competition. It was won by Dynamo Novosibirsk, which defeated 1983 champions BSE Budapest in the final match, which took place in the Palau Blaugrana in Barcelona, Spain on 11 March 1986. Dynamo Novosibirsk became the fourth Soviet club to win the competition after Spartak Leningrad, Spartak Moscow and Daugava Rīga.

First Qualification Round

Second Qualification Round

Group stage

Grup A

Grup B

Grup C

Grup D

Semifinals

Final

References

1985-86
1985–86 in European women's basketball